Furong River Bridge is a concrete cantilever bridge near Haokouxiang, on the border of Wulong County and Pengshui Miao and Tujia Autonomous County in Chongqing, China. The bridge spans  over the Furong River a tributary of the Wu River.

Construction accident
During construction an accident occurred when a cable snapped causing a cableway container with over 20 workers to fall onto the partially built road deck. 11 workers died in the accident and 12 more were seriously injured.

See also
List of highest bridges in the world

References

Bridges in Chongqing
Bridges completed in 2009